Lacy's Caves are a series of five chambers in the red sandstone cliff of the River Eden, just north of Little Salkeld, Cumbria, England, near Nunnery, Cumbria, at .

They are named after Lieutenant-Colonel Samuel Lacy of nearby Salkeld Hall, who commissioned their carving in the 18th century. The reason for their creation is unknown; however, they were used by Lacy for entertaining guests, and the area was originally planted with ornamental gardens.

The site is a listed Regionally Important Geological Site by Eden District Council and public footpaths to the site are well maintained. Some of the path follows the line of a former tramway connecting Long Meg Mine with the nearby Settle–Carlisle line. The site is close to the ancient stone circle Long Meg and Her Daughters, and is on a popular circular walk.

References

External links 

 Eden District Council list of Regionally Important Geological Sites
 Article on Visit Cumbria
 Article on North Pennines

Tourist attractions in Cumbria
Regionally Important Geological / Geomorphological Sites (RIGS) in Cumbria
Geology of Cumbria